Bae Chun-Suk (born April 27, 1990) is a South Korean football player who plays for Jeonnam Dragons as a striker.

Club statistics
Statistics accurate as of 6 December 2015

1Includes Emperor's Cup.
2Includes J.League Cup.

References

External links

1990 births
Living people
Association football forwards
South Korean footballers
South Korean expatriate footballers
Vissel Kobe players
Pohang Steelers players
Jeonnam Dragons players
J1 League players
K League 1 players
Expatriate footballers in Japan
South Korean expatriate sportspeople in Japan
Busan IPark players
Sportspeople from Daegu